Mettam Memorial Baptist Church is a historic Baptist church located at Pikesville, Baltimore County, Maryland. It was renovated in 1965–1966 by the Pikesville Lions Club. The church sits on an acre of ground which includes a cemetery. The building is named for its first pastor, Joseph Mettam. The congregation joined with five others to found the Maryland Baptist Union Association, later the Baptist State Mission Board of Maryland.

It was listed on the National Register of Historic Places in 1975.

References

External links
, including photo from 1968, at Maryland Historical Trust

Churches on the National Register of Historic Places in Maryland
Churches completed in 1835
19th-century Baptist churches in the United States
Baptist churches in Maryland
Churches in Baltimore County, Maryland
Religious buildings and structures in Pikesville, Maryland
National Register of Historic Places in Baltimore County, Maryland